This is a list of notable alumni of The George Washington University Law School located in Washington, D.C., U.S.

Notable alumni

Academia
 Ernest L. Wilkinson (1926), former President of Brigham Young University

Business
 Mark Britton (1992), founder and CEO of Avvo (now Martindale-Avvo), and former Executive Vice President and General Counsel at Expedia, Inc.
 Warren Brown (1998), founder of Cake Love and host of Sugar Rush on the Food Network
 Dan Glickman (1969), former Chairman and CEO of the Motion Picture Association of America, former United States Secretary of Agriculture, and former U.S. Congressman from Kansas
 Charles James (1979), former General Counsel of Chevron-Texaco, former Assistant Attorney General
 Michael W. Rice, Chairman and CEO of Utz Quality Foods
 D. Bruce Sewell (1986), Senior Vice President and General Counsel of Apple, Inc. and former Vice President and Deputy General Counsel at Intel

Sports
 David Falk (1975), agent for Michael Jordan
 Ted Lerner (1950), owner of the Washington Nationals
 Larry MacPhail (1910), Hall of Fame baseball executive for Cincinnati Reds, Brooklyn Dodgers and New York Yankees

Government and politics

U.S. Congress members
 E. Ross Adair, U.S. Representative from Indiana (1951–1971) and U.S. Ambassador to Ethiopia (1971–1974)
 Garry E. Brown (1954), former U.S. Congressman from Michigan
 Gordon Canfield (1926), former U.S. Congressman from New Jersey
 Bennett Champ Clark, former United States Senator
 William Henry Coleman, former U.S. Congressman from Pennsylvania
 Pedro Pierluisi (1984), current Governor of Puerto Rico and former Resident Commissioner of Puerto Rico of Puerto Rico
 Félix Córdova Dávila, former Resident Commissioner of Puerto Rico from Puerto Rico
 John Blaisdell Corliss (1875), former United States Congressman
 Ewin L. Davis (1899), former U.S. Congressman from Tennessee
 John James Duncan Jr. (1973), United States Congressman for the Second District of Tennessee
 John James Flynt Jr. (1940), United States Congressman from Georgia
 J. William Fulbright (1934), former United States Senator, creator of the Fulbright Fellowships
 Ralph A. Gamble (1911), former U.S. Congressman from New York
 Stephen Warfield Gambrill (1896), former United States Congressman
 Ernest W. Gibson Jr., former Governor of Vermont, U.S. Senator, judge for the U.S. District Court for the District of Vermont
 Daniel Inouye (1953), former United States Senator, (D-HI)
 Orval H. Hansen (1954) (LLM 1973), former U.S. Congressman from Idaho
 Frank Moss (1937), former United States Senator, (D-UT)
 Francis G. Newlands (1869), congressman and drafter of the Newlands Resolution to annex the Republic of Hawaii
 Jim Ramstad (1973), congressman whose work led to ending discrimination against those suffering from mental health and addiction problems.
 Harry Reid (1964), United States Senator, former Senate Minority Leader, (D-NV)
 James Shannon, former U.S. Congressman and Massachusetts Attorney General
 Susan Wild, U.S. Congresswoman from Pennsylvania
 Robert Wexler (1985), congressman, (D-FL)
 Earle D. Willey, former U.S. Congressman from Delaware

Other federal officials
 William Barr (1977), former United States Attorney General
 David Bernhardt (1994), former United States Secretary of the Interior
 Russell Vought, current Director of the Office of Management and Budget
 A. Bruce Bielaski (1904), second director of the Bureau of Investigation
 Floyd I. Clarke, former director of the Federal Bureau of Investigation
 Kellyanne Conway (1992), Political strategist and pollster, Campaign Manager for Donald Trump's 2016 presidential campaign, Counselor to the President
 George B. Cortelyou, cabinet member in the Theodore Roosevelt administration
 Makan Delrahim, United States Assistant Attorney General 
 Mary DeRosa (1984), former Deputy Counsel to the President for National Security Affairs in the Obama Administration
 Allen Dulles (1926), longest serving (1953–61) director of the CIA
 John Foster Dulles, Secretary of State in the Dwight D. Eisenhower administration
 W. Mark Felt (1940), former associate director of the FBI and Watergate scandal informant also known as "Deep Throat"
 Stanley Finch (1908), first director of the Bureau of Investigation
 Gregory G. Garre (1991), former Solicitor General of the United States
 L. Patrick Gray, former acting director of the FBI during the Watergate scandal
 Will A. Gunn,  was sworn in as the General Counsel for the Department of Veterans Affairs on May 26, 2009
 Kenneth R. Harding (1937), former Sergeant at Arms of the United States House of Representatives (1972–1980)
 Patricia Roberts Harris (1960), First African American woman to serve in the United States Cabinet as Secretary of Housing and Urban Development in the Jimmy Carter administration
 John D. Holum, Director of the U.S. Arms Control and Disarmament Agency and Under Secretary of State for Arms Control and International Security under Bill Clinton.
 J. Edgar Hoover (1917), longtime director of the Federal Bureau of Investigation
 Edward F. Howrey (1927), chair of the Federal Trade Commission, later founded the law firm of Howrey LLP
 Leon Jaworski (1926), special prosecutor during the Watergate Scandal.
 David M. Kennedy, former United States Secretary of the Treasury
 Bruce M. Lawlor, retired United States Army major general and former chief of staff at the Department of Homeland Security
 Wilma B. Liebman (1974) Chair, National Labor Relations Board
 Eric O'Neill (2003), FBI agent whose work led to the arrest and life imprisonment conviction of Robert Hanssen
 Walter North, U.S. Ambassador to Papua New Guinea, Solomon Islands, and Vanuatu (2012–present).  
 Maria Pallante (1990), current U.S. Register of Copyrights
 Marybeth Peters (1971), former U.S. Register of Copyrights
 Mary Schapiro, (1980), Chair of the Securities and Exchange Commission. First woman to chair the SEC.
 John W. Snow (1967), former United States Secretary of the Treasury
 James E. Webb (1936), second administrator of NASA
 James A. Wetmore (1896), acting Supervising Architect of the Office of the Supervising Architect

State and local government
 Rocky Anderson (1978), former mayor of Salt Lake City
 James P. Coleman (1939), former Governor of Mississippi and chief judge on the U.S. Court of Appeals for the Fifth Circuit
 Lee E. Emerson, Governor of Vermont, 1951-1955
 John W. Hardwicke, Maryland delegate and lawyer
 Harry R. Hughes (1952), former governor of the state of Maryland
 Rod Johnston, former Wisconsin State Senator
 Alex Knopp (1981), former mayor of Norwalk, Connecticut
 Edward S. Northrop (1937), Majority Leader of Maryland State Senate (1958–1961), Chair of the Finance Committee (1958), nominated by President Kennedy in 1961 for a new seat on the United States District Court for the District of Maryland. Elevated to Chief Judge and held that position until 1981.
 Carmen Ortiz (1981), first woman and the first Hispanic to serve as United States Attorney for the District of Massachusetts
 Arnold C. Otto, former Wisconsin State Assemblyman
Edward Blackmon Jr. (1973) Mississippi House of Representatives
Jeffrey Piccola (1973) Pennsylvania State Representative, 1977-1995, Pennsylvania State Senator, 1995-2012
 Grant Sawyer, former Governor of Nevada
 Deanne Mazzochi, Illinois House of Representatives

International
 Hsu Mo (1922), former International Court of Justice Judge
 Árpád Bogsch (1956), former director general (1973–1997) of the World Intellectual Property Organization
 Camillo Gonsalves, Permanent Representative of Saint Vincent and the Grenadines to the United Nations
 Somanahalli Mallaiah Krishna, Foreign Minister of India, former Chief Minister of Karnataka
 Yasmine Pahlavi, Crown Princess of Iran
 Mikheil Saakashvili (1996), President of Georgia
Anja Seibert-Fohr (2000,2004), judge at the European Court of Human Rights

Judiciary

Federal
 James C. Cacheris (1960), judge U.S. District Court for the Eastern District of Virginia
 Joyce Hens Green, (1951), senior judge U.S. District Court for the District of Columbia
 Harold H. Greene (1954), former judge U.S. District Court for the District of Columbia, presided over lawsuit which broke up AT&T's vertical monopoly
 Kelly Higashi,  associate judge on the Superior Court of the District of Columbia
 Sarah T. Hughes (1922), first female federal judge seated in Texas, and only woman to administer the oath of office to the President of the United States
 Edwin F. Hunter (1938), longest sitting U.S. District Court judge in the nation
 Daniel T. K. Hurley (1968), judge U.S. District Court for the Southern District of Florida
 Darrin P. Gayles (1993), judge U.S. District Court for the Southern District of Florida
 Barbara Milano Keenan (1974), judge U.S. Court of Appeals for the Fourth Circuit
 Carlos F. Lucero (1964), judge U.S. Court of Appeals for the Tenth Circuit
 Burnita Shelton Matthews (1920), first woman to serve as a US district judge U.S. District Court for the District of Columbia
 Suzanne Mitchell, United States magistrate judge for the Western District of Oklahoma and a former nominee to be a United States district judge of the United States District Court for the Western District of Oklahoma
 Sharon Prost (LLM 1984), judge United States Court of Appeals for the Federal Circuit
 Randall Ray Rader (1978), judge United States Court of Appeals for the Federal Circuit
 Kenneth Francis Ripple (1972), judge U.S. Court of Appeals for the Seventh Circuit
 James Robertson (1965), judge U.S. District Court for the District of Columbia, presided over Hamdan v. Rumsfeld
 William K. Sessions III (1972), chief judge U.S. District Court for the District of Vermont and Vice Chair of the United States Sentencing Commission
 Scott W. Stucky (LLM 1983), judge United States Court of Appeals for the Armed Forces
 Bolon B. Turner (LLM 1924), judge United States Tax Court

State
 Albert T. Blackwell Jr., Justice of the Maryland Court of Appeals
 Carmen E. Espinosa (1976), First Hispanic judge for the Connecticut Superior Court, Connecticut Appellate Court, and the Connecticut Supreme Court
 R. C. McDonough (1949), Justice of the Montana Supreme Court
 George B. Nelson (1902), Justice of the Wisconsin Supreme Court
 Gregory K. Orme (1978), Judge Utah Court of Appeals
 Barbara Pariente (1973), current Chief Justice of the Florida Supreme Court
 Leslie Perkins Snow (1891), Justice of the New Hampshire Supreme Court
 Joshua Soule Zimmerman, West Virginia House Delegate

Lawyers
 Michael Avenatti (1999), lawyer who filed a lawsuit on behalf of Stormy Daniels seeking to invalidate a 2016 "hush" agreement regarding an alleged affair with Donald Trump
 Ian C. Ballon (1986), Internet lawyer and author of several law books, including a 4-volume legal treatise on e-commerce law
 Jacob Burns (1924), corporate attorney, educator and philanthropist
 Charles Colson, leader in the Christian right movement, former Special Counsel to Richard Nixon, and jailed for conspiring during the Watergate scandal
 Roy Den Hollander, men's rights lawyer who became the main suspect in the fatal attack on Judge Esther Salas' family
 Denise Tourover Ezekiel (1924), lawyer who served in various executive positions for Hadassah, the Women's Zionist Organization of America
 Francis La Flesche, first professional Native American (Omaha) anthropologist
 Prerna Lal, immigration attorney
 Belva Ann Lockwood (1872), first woman to argue before the United States Supreme Court
 Frank Neuhauser (1940), patent attorney and winner of the first National Spelling Bee in 1925
 M. Gerald Schwartzbach (1969), California criminal defense attorney
 Harry Aubrey Toulmin Sr. (1882), patent attorney to the Wright Brothers
 Nathan Hale Williams, film and television producer, entertainment lawyer

Media
 Margaret Carlson, American journalist and currently a columnist for Bloomberg News
 Mona Charen, political analyst and best-selling author
 David Eisenhower (1976), author and grandson of Dwight D. Eisenhower
 Michael Kinsley, political commentator and journalist, former co-host of CNN's Crossfire
Matt Medved, American journalist and currently editor-in-chief of Spin

Military
 Earl E. Anderson, Ret. General United States Marine Corps
 Richard A. Appelbaum, Ret. U.S. Coast Guard Rear Admiral
 Vaughn Ary - Staff Judge Advocate to the Commandant of the United States Marine Corps
 Jedediah Hyde Baxter, son of Portus Baxter and Surgeon General of the United States Army
 Murdock A. Campbell (1919), United States Army Major General and Adjutant General of the Vermont National Guard
 John Fugh (1960), former Judge Advocate General
 Wilfred A. Hearn, former Judge Advocate General
James F. Lawrence Jr. (1953), first Marine lawyer to be promoted to brigadier general, Navy Cross recipient
 Sidney A. Wallace, retired United States Coast Guard Rear Admiral

Religion
 Charles Colson (1959), former White House Counsel, born-again Christian, and founder of Prison Fellowship
 Matthew Cowley (1925), former Apostle of the Church of Jesus Christ of Latter-day Saints
 Brooks Hays (1922), United States Congressman (D-AR) and President of the Southern Baptist Convention

References